Andernos-les-Bains is a commune in the Gironde department, southwestern France. Andernos-les-Bains is a located on the northeast shore of Arcachon Bay. To its northwest is the town of Arès.

Andernos-les-Bains consists of four other small communities: Taussat, Cassy, Lanton and Audenge. All these villages have oyster farms and small fisheries. For many years, the oyster and fishing industry provided the main income to the area. More recently, tourism has become a strong economic factor in the area.

The bay's Portuguese oysters died out during 1970-1972 because of gill disease. In 1974 another oyster, the Pacific oyster, developed a disease caused by the paint used on fishing boats. An oil tanker spill in 1978 further damaged the oyster industry, which continued to suffer around the bay until 1981. Since 2000 the oyster industry has been recovering and now nearly 15,000 metric tons are produced per year.

Population

Transport

Sights
 The Great Dune of Pyla – the longest in Europe
 Island of Birds
 Cape Ferret light house at the tip of the Arcachon Bay
 The prehistoric remains of the Betey

Twin towns – sister cities

Andernos-les-Bains is twinned with:
 Largs, Scotland, United Kingdom
 Nußloch, Germany
 Segorbe, Spain

See also
Communes of the Gironde department

References

External links

Andernos-les-Bains Official website
Andernos-les-Bains Information

Communes of Gironde
Populated coastal places in France